SBS9 is a Dutch commercial television channel owned by Talpa Network through Talpa TV. The channel was launched on 1 January 2015 at 12:00 CET with a movie marathon. The channel can be received via all television providers in the Netherlands. Other channels of the group in the Netherlands are SBS6, Net5 and Veronica.

History
SBS Broadcasting announced its plans for a launch of a fourth channel in the Netherlands already in 2009. On 22 August 2014, the company officially released its definite plans for a new channel targeting female viewers. The channel got its name SBS9 on 27 September 2014. The launch date was set in January 2015.

On 10 April 2017 Talpa Holding acquired a 67% stake from Sanoma Media Netherlands.

Programming
Mainly films and television series with every day of the week a different theme:
 Mondays: Various
 Tuesdays: Comedy
 Wednesdays: Action
 Thursdays: Drama
 Fridays: Family
 Saturdays: Thriller
 Sundays: Romance

References

External links
 

Television channels in the Netherlands
Television channels and stations established in 2015
Mass media in Amsterdam
2015 establishments in the Netherlands
Talpa Network